Tropical Storm Emilia was a rare tropical cyclone that affected the Baja California Peninsula in July 2006. It moved northward toward the coast, reaching peak winds of  before turning westward and encountering unfavorable conditions. Emilia later turned to the north, passing near Baja California as a strong tropical storm. Subsequently, the storm moved further away from the coast, and on July 27 it dissipated.

The storm brought tropical storm force winds and precipitation to the southwestern Mexican coastline. Later, Emilia produced similar conditions in the southern portion of the Baja California peninsula, where its passage caused minor damage and flooding. Moisture from Emilia reached the southwestern United States, producing thunderstorms and flash flooding in Arizona, as well as beneficial rainfall in southern California. No deaths were reported in association with Emilia.

Meteorological history

The origins of Emilia can be traced to a tropical wave that crossed northern Central America into the eastern Pacific Ocean on July 16. The next day, its forward motion had shifted to a slow north-northwest track, and with its convection continuing to organize around the low, the National Hurricane Center (NHC) remarked on the potential for tropical cyclogenesis. Early on July 21, its thunderstorm activity organized enough for the NHC to classify it as Tropical Depression Six-E, located to the southwest of Acapulco.

Upon becoming a tropical cyclone, the depression existed in an area of weak steering currents, though a general motion to the north-northwest was influenced by a large subtropical ridge over the southwest United States. The circulation was initially located east of the main convection, due to the presence of wind shear. Around the same time, the storm was developing better-defined rainbands, and with favorable conditions expected, Emilia was forecast to attain hurricane status; the NHC noted the potential for rapid deepening as the storm passed near southwestern Mexico.

Early on July 23, the storm briefly became disorganized, with the low-level circulation becoming ill-defined. Later that day, after turning west-northwestward, the convection increased markedly as an eyewall began to form.

Operationally, the NHC initially continued to assess the storm as with winds of 70 mph (115 m/h), with hurricane status predicted. However, the decrease in strength became evident on July 24, when dry air became entrained in the circulation; at the same time, the convection became limited to the southern semicircle of the storm. On July 25, the wind shear decreased as the storm turned toward the Baja California Peninsula, despite that tropical cyclones affecting the Baja California Peninsula in the month of July are rare.

After brushing the peninsula with its outer rainbands, Emilia turned away from the coast into cooler waters, and subsequently began to weaken rapidly. On July 27 it deteriorated into a tropical depression, and the next day Emilia degenerated into a convective-less remnant low.

Preparations and impact

As Emilia first approached the southwest coast of Mexico, officials issued a tropical storm watch from Manzanillo to Cabo Corrientes, Jalisco; the watch was discontinued 30 hours after it was issued. The storm passed the region on July 22, and is believed to have produced tropical storm force wind gusts along the coastline. A ship recorded  winds while Emilia was just off the coast. Further up the coast, in Mazatlán, strong waves from the storm caused beaches to close, while the outer fringes of the storm dropped  of precipitation. Inland, the interaction between Emilia and a tropical wave brought increased moisture and precipitation to southeastern and central Mexico.

When Emilia began turning toward the Baja California Peninsula, the government of Mexico issued a tropical storm watch from Buena Vista along the Gulf of California to Bahía Magdalena along the Pacific coast. The watch was replaced with a tropical storm warning about 12 hours prior to the closest approach of the storm, and additional warnings were issued along the Pacific coastline as the storm passed. All watches and warnings were discontinued by July 27. Officials prepared two schools as emergency shelters in Cabo San Lucas, where 100 people stayed during the storm. In the area, the threat of the storm resulted in the closure of several bars and restaurants.

Across the southern portion of the Baja California peninsula, the storm dropped moderate rainfall, with a total of about  reported in Cabo San Lucas; the NHC remarked that higher amounts likely occurred in higher elevations. The rainfall caused minor flooding in and around Cabo San Lucas. The storm caused minor damage to buildings and utility lines. Waves from the storm left minor damage at several marinas in the region, with several being closed for two days.

The effects of Emilia reached the southwestern United States. In southern Arizona, a surge of moisture from the storm produced scattered thunderstorms, including one severe thunderstorm in Santa Cruz County. Unsettled conditions persisted across Arizona for about a week. In southern California, the storm dropped light rainfall, which assisted firefighters in containing a wildfire.

See also

 List of Baja California Peninsula hurricanes
 Other tropical cyclones named Emilia
 Timeline of the 2006 Pacific hurricane season
 List of storms in the 2006 Pacific hurricane season

References

External links
 The NHC's advisory archive for Tropical Storm Emilia

2006 Pacific hurricane season
Eastern Pacific tropical storms
Pacific hurricanes in Mexico
Tropical Storm Emilia
Tropical cyclones in 2006